Woolly pomaderris is a common name for several plants and may refer to:

Pomaderris lanigera, endemic to southeastern Australia
Pomaderris vellea, endemic to eastern Australia